Louth County Council is the authority responsible for local government in County Louth, Ireland. As a county council, it is governed by the Local Government Act 2001. The council is responsible for housing and community, roads and transportation, urban planning and development, amenity and culture, and environment. The council has 29 elected members. Elections are held every five years and are by single transferable vote. The head of the council has the title of Cathaoirleach (Chairperson). The county administration is headed by a Chief Executive, Joan Martin. The county town is Dundalk.

History
Originally meetings of Louth County Council took place in Dundalk Courthouse. A home for the county officials was subsequently established at County Buildings in Crowe Street and both the county council and its officials moved to County Hall in 2000.

Local Electoral Areas and Municipal Districts
Louth County Council is divided into the following borough and municipal districts and local electoral areas, defined by electoral divisions. The municipal district which contains the administrative area of the former Drogheda Borough Council is referred to as a Borough District.

Councillors have regular monthly meetings both as a whole council and within their municipal district.

Councillors

2019 seats summary

Councillors by electoral area
This list reflects the order in which councillors were elected on 24 May 2019.

Notes

Co-options

Chief executive (county manager)
Each council has a chief executive, previous to 2014 known as city or county manager, who is the manager of the local authority.

Cathaoirleach of Council (Chairperson) 
Every year, each local authority elects a chair called the Cathaoirleach for a term of one year and a deputy chair called the Leas-Cathaoirleach from among its members. The members elected for each municipal district elect a Cathaoirleach and a Leas-Chathaoirleach for their grouping. The Cathaoirleach chairs the meetings of the local authority or municipal district. Mayor and Deputy Mayor are titles used in municipal districts which were formerly borough councils.

Population by Local Electoral Area
The table below sets out the population of the county broken down by Local Electoral Area, total 2016 population of 128,884.

Population by Municipal District
The table below sets out the population of the county broken down by Municipal District, total 2016 population of 128,884.

Population by Electoral Division
The table below sets out the population of the county broken down by Electoral Division.

References

External links

Council and Democracy Maps – Maps of local electoral areas, municipal districts, and electoral divisions

Politics of County Louth
County councils in the Republic of Ireland
Drogheda
Dundalk